The white-throated thrush (Turdus assimilis) is a species of bird in the family Turdidae. It is found in Mexico and Central America, ranging south to central Panama. This species has been referred to in some literature as "white-throated robin." However, that name is now more usually applied to the Old World species Irania gutturalis.

Subspecies
There are 13 subspecies, and the Dagua thrush (East Panama and coastal South America) and white-necked thrush (South America) have sometimes also been included as subspecies.

Description
It features a distinctive black and white streaked throat bounded by a solid white crescent. Breast is light gray to gray-brown, back is dark gray to gray-brown. It also has bold yellow eyerings, bill and feet.

Habitat, status and vagrancy
Its natural habitats are subtropical or tropical dry forests, subtropical or tropical moist lowland forests, and subtropical or tropical moist montane forests. It is common in its range and an extremely rare vagrant into Texas and Arizona; 3 sightings have been recorded (1990 and 1998 in Texas and 2019 in Arizona).

References

Further reading

External links

 
 
 
 
 
 

white-throated thrush
Birds of Central America
white-throated thrush
Taxonomy articles created by Polbot